The Basrah Medical College is situated in the city of Basra, Iraq.
Basrah Medical College has been established in 1967. Undergraduate studies started in the academic year 1967-1968 by accepting 65 students.

References

External links 
 Basrah Medical College

Medical schools in Iraq
Basra